Pindaya Township (also spelled Pingdaya or Pangtara) is a township located within Taunggyi District, Shan State, Myanmar. It is also part of the Danu Self-Administered Zone. The principal town is Pindaya.

Townships of Shan State